{{DISPLAYTITLE:IV△7–V7–iii7–vi progression}}

It involves the seventh chords of IV, V, and iii, along with a vi chord; for example, in the key of C major, this would be: FM7–G7–Em7–Am.

The chord progression may be resolved with the tonic chord, for example in a IV△7–V7–I or a ii7–V7–I progression. IV△7–V7–iii7–vi–ii7–V7–I creates a full circle of fifths progression in the major mode, with V7 substituting for vii°.

Nomenclature
The informal name for the progression, literally translates to "royal road progression"; in Japanese, the expression  is used to describe an easy or painless method to do something.

An alternative term, koakuma chord progression, was originally coined by Japanese music producer Seiji Kameda on the 2014 NHK television show . The phrase  is a pejorative phrase used to describe a seductive lover who teases with one's feelings; as the chord progression involves two major chords in succession followed immediately by two minor chords, Kameda describes the moment where the progression moves from the major dominant chord to the minor mediant chord as akin to the moment of heartbreak induced by a playful lover, hence the name.

History
The IV△7–V7–iii7–vi progression was originally influenced by jazz and rock progressions originating in Western music. Music featuring similar chord progressions were introduced to Japan via Eurodisco-influenced pop tracks that became popular during their early boom in Japan. The chord progression has become prolific in J-pop to the point where it has become a core part of modern Japanese music; pop music lacking the progression is often described as sounding "not Japanese". While artists' overuse of the ōdō progression can often be criticised as lacking in creative originality, the corpus of songs that become bestsellers in Japan and perform well on Japanese record charts feature plenty of tracks utilising the progression, thus contributing to the conservative nature of record labels that lean towards familiar progressions over more risky experimentation.

When this progression is resolved by a ii7–V7–I cadence, it becomes IV△7–V7–iii7–vi–ii7–V7–I, a full circle of fifths progression with V7 substituting for the vii° chord. The circle of fifths progression was used regularly in tonal music since the Baroque era. 

In Western pop music, the progression can be used without the seventh notes, so that it becomes IV–V–iii–vi. Rick Astley's "Together Forever" would be an example of this. If resolved by an ii-V-I cadence, this becomes IV-V-iii-vi-ii-V-I.

Songs using the progression

This is a list of recorded songs containing multiple, repeated uses of the IV△7–V7–iii7–vi progression.

Asian music

Western music 
In Western music, the progression is sometimes seen without the seventh notes, or with some substitution for one of the chords in the progression. Examples include:

Classical pieces that use this progression
Sergei Rachmaninoff's 2nd symphony features a IV–V7–iii–vi–ii7–V7–I sequence in the third movement.

See also
I–V–vi–IV progression - four chord progression commonly used in Western pop music

References

Chord progressions
Japanese music